Leif Johan Korn (born 26 July 1937) is a retired Swedish gymnast. He competed in all gymnastics events at the 1960 and the 1964 Summer Olympics with the best result of ninth place on the rings in 1964.

References

1937 births
Living people
Swedish male artistic gymnasts
Olympic gymnasts of Sweden
Gymnasts at the 1960 Summer Olympics
Gymnasts at the 1964 Summer Olympics
Sportspeople from Stockholm